This is a list of episodes of the Chinese variety show Keep Running in season 5. In this season, the show changes its name to Keep Running. The show airs on ZRTG: Zhejiang Television.

Episodes

Notes

References

External links
Keep Running Official Homepage

2017 Chinese television seasons